Pain Khiyaban-e Litkuh Rural District is a rural district (dehestan) in the Central District of Amol County, Mazandaran Province, Iran. According to the 2006 census, its population was 20,679, in 5,313 families. The rural district has 37 villages.

References 

Rural Districts of Mazandaran Province
Amol County